The Annaquatucket River is a river in the U.S. state of Rhode Island. It flows approximately 7 km (5 mi) and drains a watershed of 18.9 km² (7.3 sq. mi). There are two dams along the river's length.

Course
The Annaquatucket rises on the north side of Pork Hill in North Kingstown, near Hatchery Road.  The river flows north to Rhode Island State Route 4, then turns south and flows into Belleville Pond.  South of the pond, the river continues in a southeasterly direction to its mouth at Narragansett Bay.

Crossings
Below is a list of all crossings over the Annaquatucket River.  The list starts at the headwaters and goes downstream.
North Kingstown
Rhode Island State Route 4
Lafayette Road
U.S. Route 1
Featherbed Lane
Rhode Island State Route 1A

See also
List of rivers in Rhode Island

References
Maps from the United States Geological Survey

Rivers of Washington County, Rhode Island
North Kingstown, Rhode Island
Rivers of Rhode Island